Sorgun (Also called Büyüksorgun) is a  village in Erdemli district of Mersin Province, Turkey. The village is situated in the Taurus Mountains, and in summers, it is used as a summer resort, also known as a yayla. The population of Sorgun was 903  as of 2012. The village is one of the oldest Turkmens villages around. The traditional Yörük articles are exhibited by the muhtar of the village. Around Sorgun there are ruins dated back to Roman and Byzantine era and tombstones from Ottoman era. Main economic activities of the village are agriculture, animal breeding  and beehiving. Tomato, cucumber, apple, cherry and hickory nut are among the crops.

References

Villages in Erdemli District
Yaylas in Turkey